Marshall Schreiber Herskovitz (born February 23, 1952) is an American film director, writer, and producer, and currently the President Emeritus of the Producers Guild of America. Among his productions are Traffic, The Last Samurai, Blood Diamond, and I Am Sam. Herskovitz has directed two feature films, Jack the Bear and Dangerous Beauty. Herskovitz was a creator and executive producer of the television shows thirtysomething, My So-Called Life, and Once and Again, and also wrote and directed several episodes of all three series.

Life and career
Herskovitz was born in Philadelphia, Pennsylvania, the son of Frieda (née Schreiber) and Alexander Herskovitz. His family is Jewish.

He was married to screenwriter Susan Shilliday from 1981 to 1993. They have two daughters.

Herskovitz married Landry Major in 2015.

Herskovitz has long been "one of the film industry's most active and passionate environmentalists." He serves on the advisory board of The Climate Mobilization, a grassroots advocacy group calling for a national economic mobilization against climate change on the scale of the home front during World War II, with the goal of 100% clean energy and net zero greenhouse gas emissions by 2025.

Awards
Thirtysomething won numerous Primetime Emmy Awards, including Outstanding Drama series in 1988. That year it also won Outstanding Writing in a Drama series for an episode that Herskovitz co-wrote with Paul Haggis. The show also received the Best Drama Series award at the Golden Globes that year. Herskovitz himself was honored by both the Writers Guild and Directors Guild for his work on the series.

Traffic was nominated for Best Picture at the 73rd Academy Awards in 2001.

Once and Again was nominated for Best Drama Series of 1999 at the Golden Globes.

Filmography

Executive producer
 Lone Star State of Mind (2002)
 Defiance (2008)
 About Alex (2014)
 Boys of Abu Ghraib (2014)

Other credits

References

External links
 
 Art Film Talk #23 Marshall Herskovitz – Interview about Quarterlife, November 30, 2007 (audio)

1952 births
Living people
American film directors
American film producers
American male screenwriters
American television directors
Television producers from Pennsylvania
American television writers
Brandeis University alumni
Writers from Philadelphia
Writers Guild of America Award winners
Directors Guild of America Award winners
Primetime Emmy Award winners
AFI Conservatory alumni
Jewish American writers
American male television writers